National Yang Ming Chiao Tung University (NYCU) is a public research university in Taiwan. It was created in 2021 through the merger of National Yang-Ming University and National Chiao Tung University. At present, there are 19 colleges, 74 university/college level research centers, and 1 hospital in Yilan. 

NYCU is one of six national universities in research selected by the Ministry of Education. The university is also one of four universities selected by the Ministry of Education to participate in the Global Taiwan Program.

It is consistently ranked among the top three or four best universities in Taiwan in world university rankings. In the 2022 QS World University Rankings, it is ranked in the top 300 universities in the world and the top 50 universities in Asia. In the 2022 Times Higher Education World University Rankings, it is ranked in the top 350 universities in the world.

History

The university's merger history dates back to as early as the 1990s, but the most important step was in 2001, when the presidents of the two universities Dr. Yan-Hwa Wu and Dr. Chun-Yen Chang signed a Letter of Intent. In 2015, the university assembly of National Chiao Tung University approved the agreement but it failed at the National Yang-Ming University. The merger of the two universities was suspended until 2018 when President Hsu-Sung "Steve" Kuo of National Yang-Ming University relaunched the discussions. At the beginning, both National Chiao Tung University and National Tsing Hua University all showed strong motivations to negotiate merger proposal with National Yang-Ming University. The university assembly of National Yang-Ming University finally decided to discuss the merger proposal with National Chiao Tung University under the new name of "National Yang Ming Chiao Tung University". The two universities then agreed to the merger plan in September 2019, which was then approved by the Ministry of Education in June 2020. The National Yang Ming Chiao Tung University was then founded on 1 February 2021. This is the first university merger case that adopted a "bottom-up" approach in Taiwan.

Academic

Colleges
College of Artificial Intelligence and Green Energy
College of Biological Science and Technology
College of Biomedical Science and Engineering
College of Computer Science
College of Dentistry
College of Electrical and Computer Engineering
College of Engineering
College of Humanity and Social Science
College of Humanities and Social Sciences
College of Hakka Studies
School of Law
College of Life Sciences
College of Management
College of Medicine
College of Nursing
College of Photonics
College of Pharmaceutical Sciences
College of Science
International College of Semiconductor Technology
General Education Committee
Center for General Education
Interdisciplinary Program for Undergraduates
Master Program in Transdisciplinary Long-term Care and Management
University System of Taiwan
Cross-Disciplinary Programs

Reputation

The National Yang Ming Chiao Tung University is ranked in a number of post-secondary rankings. In the 2021 Academic Ranking of World Universities rankings, the university ranked 401st – 500th in the world and 3rd - 6th in Taiwan. The 2023 QS World University Rankings ranked the university 202nd in the world, 47th in Asia, and 3rd in Taiwan. The 2022 Times Higher Education World University Rankings ranked the university 301st – 350th in the world, and 3rd - 4th in Taiwan. The 2022 U.S. News & World Report Best Global University Ranking ranked the university 587th in the world, and 3rd in Taiwan.

Campuses
 Yangming Campus in Beitou District, Taipei
Address:
No. 155, Sec. 2, Lignon Street, Beitou District, Taipei City
 Beimen Campus in Zhongzheng District, Taipei
Address:
4F, No. 118, Sec. 1, Zhongxiao West Road, Zhongzheng District, Taipei
 Guangfu Campus in East District, Hsinchu City
Address:
No. 1001, University Road, East District, Hsinchu City
 Bo'ai Campus in East District, Hsinchu City
Address:
No. 75, Boai Street, East District, Hsinchu City
 Liujia Campus in Zhubei, Hsinchu County
Address:
No. 1, Sec. 1, Liujia 5th Road, Zhubei City, Hsinchu County
 Guiren Campus in Guiren District, Tainan
Address:
No. 301, Section 2, Gaofa 3rd Road, Guiren District, Tainan City

Partners health care system
In cooperation with the Taipei City Hospital System and National Chengchi University, the three institutions formed a health care system which covers medical education, healthcare, and management.

See also
List of universities in Taiwan
Education in Taiwan

Reference

External links

 
Educational institutions established in 2021
2021 establishments in Taiwan
Universities and colleges in Taiwan
Universities and colleges in Taipei
Universities and colleges in Hsinchu
Universities and colleges in Tainan
Comprehensive universities in Taiwan
Jiaotong University